The 2019 Four Nationals Figure Skating Championships included the Czech Republic, Slovakia, Poland, and Hungary. It took place on December 14–15, 2018 in Budapest, Hungary. The results were split by country; the three highest-placing skaters from each country formed their national podiums in men's singles, ladies' singles, and ice dancing. The results were among the criteria used to determine international assignments.

Medals summary

Czech Republic

Hungary

Poland

Slovakia
Nicole Rajičová defeated Silvia Hugec for the Slovak ladies' title while Marco Klepoch overtook Michael Neuman for the men's title.

Senior results

Men
Matyáš Bělohradský was first and won the Czech senior men's title for the first time.

Ladies
Making her debut for Poland, 16-year-old Ekaterina Kurakova finished first, ahead of the Czech Republic's Eliška Březinová and Hungary's Ivett Tóth.

Ice dance
Natalia Kaliszek / Maksym Spodyriev and Anna Yanovskaya / Ádám Lukács were the Polish and Hungarian champions respectively, with Kaliszek / Spodyriev receiving the top scores.

References

External links
 
 2019 Four National Championships results

December 2018 sports events in Europe
International figure skating competitions hosted by Hungary
Four National Figure Skating Championships
Four National Figure Skating Championships
Four National Figure Skating Championships
Four National Figure Skating Championships
Four National Figure Skating Championships
Czech Figure Skating Championships
Slovak Figure Skating Championships
Polish Figure Skating Championships
Hungarian Figure Skating Championships